Balaam was a Biblical prophet.

Balaam may also refer to:

People
 Anthony Balaam (born 1965), American serial killer
 Ellen Balaam (1891–1985), Australian physician

Other
 Barlaam, the legendary Christian saint from the story Barlaam and Josaphat
 Balam (demon)
 A character in Owen Wister's The Virginian
 Baba Balaam, a character from the Pakistani animated series 3 Bahadur

See also 
 Balam (disambiguation)
 Balham (disambiguation)
 Ballam
 Barlaam (disambiguation)
 Varlaam (disambiguation)
 Varlam